Rama Raju may refer to

People
Alluri Sitarama Raju, Indian revolutionary
G. V. Rama Raju, Indian film director
Raghu Rama Krishna Raju, Indian politician
Vetukuri Venkata Siva Rama Raju, Indian politician

Art
Ramaraju, play written by Srinivasa Rao
Siva Rama Raju, Indian film